Diplocystaceae (alternatively spelled Diplocystidaceae or Diplocystidiaceae) is a family of fungi in the Boletales order. The family was described by mycologist Hanns Kreisel in 1974.

References

Boletales